Armando Nogueira (January 27, 1927 – March 29, 2010) was one of the most important Brazilian sports journalists.

External links 

1927 births
2010 deaths
Brazilian newspaper founders
People from Acre (state)